Fightin' Words is a multi-player, multi-platform word game developed by InterWorks, Inc. The game was designed as a mobile software application for mobile phone users. In the game, players compete against each other by creating words on a Scrabble style game board. The game was first developed for BlackBerry, as the BlackBerry App World lacked Words With Friends style games. The game is now available for BlackBerry and Android systems, allowing for cross-platform gameplay.

Gameplay 
Fightin' Words shares most of the same rules as Scrabble. Primary differences between the two games include letter point values and the placement of bonus tiles. Players begin a game with seven random letter tiles. Once it is a player's turn, they must use the letter tiles in their hand to create a word on the game board. The player achieves this by dragging the tile from their hand and placing it on the desired game board tile. Words can only be created vertically or horizontally. The goal of each turn is to create a word with the highest point value possible. When a player is satisfied with their word, they will end their turn by pressing the "PLAY" button. Once a player's turn has ended, the missing tiles in their hand are replenished with new tiles. This process of replenishment continues until all the game tiles available have been used. When the next player begins their turn, they must play a word that uses one or more of the tiles of a previous played word. Players may also choose to swap their tiles for a new set of tiles at the penalty of losing a turn. A game is won by the player with the most points after all tiles have been played.

Bonus tiles 
The Fightin' Words game board features different bonus tiles placed throughout the board. Bonus tiles multiply the point value of any letter tile placed on them.

POW tile 
Occasionally a player will be dealt a POW tile, which acts as any letter the player desires or replaces an existing letter tile on the game board. If a player replaces an existing letter tile with a POW tile, the letters attached to the newly placed POW tile must still form a word.

Features

Chat 
In March 2012, Fightin' Words added a chat feature to the game. By enabling the chat feature on their profiles, players can chat with each other through the game.

Random opponent 
Fightin' Words allows players to have an opponent randomly selected for them to play. Players can also request games with specific opponents by searching their user name in the game.

Multiple games 
Players can have up to 20 games ongoing simultaneously.

References

External links 
 

Android (operating system) games
BlackBerry games
Video games developed in the United States
Word games